Porcupinefishes or balloonfishes, are any of the various species of the genus Diodon, the type genus of Diodontidae.

Distinguishing features
Fish of the genus Diodon have:
 two-rooted, movable spines (which are derived from modified scales) distributed over their bodies.
 beak-like jaws, used to crush their hard-shelled prey (crustaceans and molluscs).
They differ from the swelltoads and burrfishes (genera Cyclichthys and Chilomycterus, respectively), which, in contrast, have fixed, rigid spines.

Defense mechanisms
 Like true pufferfishes of the related family Tetraodontidae, porcupinefishes can inflate themselves.  Once inflated, a porcupinefish's erected spines stand perpendicular to the skin, whereupon they then pose a major difficulty to their predators: a large porcupinefish that is fully inflated can choke a shark to death.  According to Charles Darwin in The Voyage Of the Beagle (1845), Darwin was told by a Doctor Allen of Forres, UK that the Diodon actually had been found "floating alive and distended, in the stomach of the shark" and had been known to chew its way out of shark bodies after being swallowed, causing the death of its attacker. 
 They may be poisonous, through the accumulation of tetrodotoxin or ciguatera.

Species

Extant
There are currently five recognized extant species in this genus:

Fossil
Fossils of porcupinefishes are known from Tertiary-aged marine strata. These species are similar to modern species. Fossil species include:
 Diodon tenuispinus, from the Ypresian-aged Monte Bolca lagerstatte.
 Diodon scyllai, from middle Miocene-aged Piemonte, Italy.

References

 
Diodontidae
Extant Ypresian first appearances
Marine fish genera
Taxa named by Carl Linnaeus